Raymond Malenfant (6 October 1930 – 7 January 2022) was a Canadian businessman.

Biography
He found most of his success in the hotel business, reaching his peak in the late 1980s with a fortune of approximately $400 million. 

He was known for his leadership of the Universal chain, composed of nine hotels, six office towers, multiple conference rooms, and a ski center. He was the owner of the Manoir Richelieu in Charlevoix and the Fort Garry Hotel in Winnipeg. 

Malenfant died on 7 January 2022, at the age of 91.

References

1930 births
2022 deaths
French Quebecers
20th-century Canadian businesspeople
21st-century Canadian businesspeople
Canadian hoteliers
Businesspeople from Quebec
Université Laval alumni